Campbell's Soup Cans (sometimes referred to as 32 Campbell's Soup Cans) is a work of art produced between November 1961 and March or April 1962 by American artist Andy Warhol. The non-painterly works were produced by a screen printing process and depict imagery deriving from popular culture and belong to the pop art movement.

Warhol was a commercial illustrator before embarking on painting. Campbell's Soup Cans was shown on July 9, 1962, in Warhol's first one-man gallery exhibition in the Ferus Gallery of Los Angeles, California curated by Irving Blum. The exhibition marked the West Coast debut of pop art. The subject matter initially caused offense, in part for its affront to the technique and philosophy of the earlier art movement of abstract expressionism. Warhol's motives as an artist were questioned. Warhol's association with the subject led to his name becoming synonymous with the Campbell's Soup Can paintings.

Warhol produced a wide variety of art works depicting Campbell's Soup cans during three distinct phases of his career, and he produced other works using a variety of images from the world of commerce and mass media. Today, the Campbell's Soup cans theme is generally used in reference to the original set of paintings as well as the later Warhol drawings and paintings depicting Campbell's Soup cans. Because of the eventual popularity of the entire series of similarly themed works, Warhol's reputation grew to the point where he was not only the most-renowned American pop art artist, but also the highest-priced living American artist.

Early career

New York art scene 
Warhol arrived in New York City in 1949, directly from the School of Fine Arts at Carnegie Institute of Technology. He quickly achieved success as a commercial illustrator, and his first published drawing appeared in the Summer 1949 issue of Glamour Magazine. In 1952, he had his first art gallery show at the Bodley Gallery with a display of Truman Capote-inspired works. By 1955, he was tracing photographs borrowed from the New York Public Library's photo collection with the hired assistance of Nathan Gluck, and reproducing them with a process he had developed earlier as a collegian at Carnegie Tech. His process, which foreshadowed his later work, involved pressing wet ink illustrations against adjoining paper. During the 1950s, he had regular showings of his drawings, and exhibited at the Museum of Modern Art (Recent Drawings, 1956).

Pop art 
In 1960, Warhol began producing his first canvases, which he based on comic strip subjects. In late 1961, he learned the process of silkscreening from Floriano Vecchi, who had run the Tiber Press since 1953. Though the process generally begins with a stencil drawing, it often evolves from a blown-up photograph which is then transferred with glue onto silk. In either case, one needs to produce a glue-based version of a positive two-dimensional image (positive means the open spaces that are left are where the paint will appear). Usually, the ink is rolled across the medium so that it passes through the silk and not the glue. Campbell's Soup cans were among Warhol's first silkscreen productions; the first were U.S. dollar bills. The pieces were made from stencils; one for each color. Warhol did not begin to convert photographs to silkscreens until after the original series of Campbell's Soup cans had been produced.

Although Warhol had produced silkscreens of comic strips and of other pop art subjects, he supposedly relegated himself to soup cans as a subject at the time to avoid competing with the more finished style of comics by Roy Lichtenstein. He once said "I've got to do something that really will have a lot of impacts that will be different enough from Lichtenstein and James Rosenquist, that will be very personal, that won't look like I'm doing exactly what they're doing." Between November 1961 and March or April 1962, he produced the set of soup cans. In February 1962, Lichtenstein displayed at a sold-out exhibition of cartoon pictures at Leo Castelli's eponymous Leo Castelli Gallery, ending the possibility of Warhol exhibiting his own cartoon paintings. Castelli had visited Warhol's gallery in 1961 and said that the work he saw there was too similar to Lichtenstein's, although Warhol's and Lichtenstein's comic artwork differed in subject and techniques (e.g., Warhol's comic-strip figures were humorous pop-culture caricatures such as Popeye, while Lichtenstein's were generally of stereotypical hero and heroines, inspired by comic strips devoted to adventure and romance). Castelli chose not to represent both artists at that time. (He would, in November 1964, be exhibiting Warhol, his Flower Paintings, and then again Warhol in 1966.) Lichtenstein's 1962 show was quickly followed by Wayne Thiebaud's April 17, 1962, one-man show at the Allan Stone Gallery featuring all-American foods, which agitated Warhol as he felt it jeopardized his own food-related soup can works. Warhol was considering returning to the Bodley gallery, but Bodley's director did not like his pop artworks. In 1961, Warhol was offered a three-man show by Allan Stone at the latter's 18 East 82nd Street Gallery with Rosenquist and Robert Indiana, but all three were insulted by this proposition.

Irving Blum was the first dealer to show Warhol's soup can paintings. Blum happened to be visiting Warhol in December 1961 and then May 1962, at a time when Warhol was being featured in a May 11, 1962 Time magazine article "The Slice-of-Cake School"  (that included a portion of Warhol's silkscreened 200 One Dollar Bills), along with Lichtenstein, Rosenquist, and Wayne Thiebaud. Warhol was the only artist whose photograph actually appeared in the article, which is indicative of his knack for manipulating the mass media. Blum saw dozens of Campbell's Soup can variations, including a grid of One-Hundred Soup Cans that day. Blum was shocked that Warhol had no gallery arrangement and offered him a July show at the Ferus Gallery in Los Angeles. This would be Warhol's first one-man show of his pop art. Warhol was assured by Blum that the newly founded Artforum magazine, which had an office above the gallery, would cover the show. Not only was the show Warhol's first solo gallery exhibit, but it was considered to be the West Coast premiere of pop art.  A letter from Blum to Warhol dated June 9, 1962, set the exhibition opening for July 9. Andy Warhol's first New York solo Pop exhibit was hosted at Eleanor Ward's Stable Gallery November 6–24, 1962. The exhibit included the works Marilyn Diptych, Green Coca-Cola Bottles, and Campbell's Soup Cans.

The premiere 

Warhol sent Blum thirty-two  canvases of Campbell's Soup can portraits, each representing a particular variety of the Campbell's Soup flavors available at the time. A postcard dated June 26, 1962 sent by from Irving Blum states " 32 ptgs arrived safely and look beautiful. strongly advise maintaining a low price level during initial exposure here". The thirty-two canvases are very similar: each is a realistic depiction of the iconic, mostly red and white Campbell's Soup can silkscreened onto a white background. The canvases have minor variation in the lettering of the variety names. Most of the letterings are painted in red letters. Four varieties have black lettering: Clam Chowder has parenthetical black lettering below the variety name that said (Manhattan Style), which means that the soup is tomato- and broth-based instead of the cream-based New England style; Beef has parenthetical black lettering below the variety name that says (With Vegetables and Barley); Scotch Broth has parenthetical black lettering below the variety name that said (A Hearty Soup); and Minestrone had black parenthetical lettering saying (Italian-Style Vegetable Soup). There are two varieties with red lettered parenthetical labels: Beef Broth (Bouillon) and Consommé (Beef). The font sizes only vary slightly in the variety names. However, there are a few notable stylistic font differences. Old-fashioned Tomato Rice is the only variety with lower case script. This lower case script appears to be from a slightly different font than the other variety name letters. There are other stylistic differences. Old-fashioned Tomato Rice has the word Soup depicted lower on the can, in place of a portion of ornamental starlike symbols at the bottom that the other 31 varieties have. Also, Cheddar Cheese has two banner-like addenda. In the middle-left, a small golden banner says "New!", and a middle center golden banner says "Great As A Sauce Too!".

The exhibition opened on July 9, 1962, with Warhol absent. The thirty-two single soup can canvases were placed in a single line, much like products on shelves, each displayed on narrow individual ledges. The contemporary impact was uneventful, but the historical impact is considered today to have been a watershed. The gallery audience was unsure what to make of the exhibit. A John Coplans Artforum article, which was in part spurred on by the responding display of dozens of soup cans by a nearby gallery with a display advertising them at three for 60 cents, encouraged people to take a stand on Warhol. Few actually saw the paintings at the Los Angeles exhibit or at Warhol's studio, but word spread in the form of controversy and scandal due to the work's seeming attempt to replicate the appearance of manufactured objects. Extended debate on the merits and ethics of focusing one's efforts on such a mundane commercial inanimate model kept Warhol's work in art world conversations. The pundits could not believe an artist would reduce the art form to the equivalent of a trip to the local grocery store. Talk did not translate into monetary success for Warhol. Dennis Hopper was the first of only a half dozen to pay $100 for a canvas. Blum decided to try to keep the thirty-two canvases as an intact set and bought back the few sales. This pleased Warhol who had conceived of them as a set, and he agreed to sell the set for ten monthly $100 installments to Blum. Warhol had passed the milestone of his first serious art show. While this exhibition was on view in Los Angeles, Martha Jackson canceled another planned December 1962 New York exhibition.

The Ferus show closed on August 4, 1962, the day before Marilyn Monroe's death. Warhol went on to purchase a Monroe publicity still from the film Niagara, which he later cropped and used to create one of his most well-known works: his painting of Marilyn. Although Warhol continued painting other pop art, including Martinson's coffee cans, Coca-Cola bottles, S&H Green Stamps, and Campbell's Soup cans, he soon became known to many as the artist who painted celebrities. He returned to Blum's gallery to exhibit Elvis and Liz in October 1963. His fans Dennis Hopper and Brooke Hayward (Hopper's wife at the time) held a welcoming party for the event.

Since Warhol gave no indication of a definitive ordering of the collection, the sequence chosen by MoMA (in the picture at the upper right of this article) in the display from their permanent collection reflects the chronological order in which the varieties were introduced by the Campbell Soup Company, beginning with Tomato in the upper left, which debuted in 1897. By April 2011, the curators at the MoMA had reordered the varieties, moving Clam Chowder to the upper left and Tomato to the bottom of the four rows.

Motivation 

Several anecdotal stories supposedly explain why Warhol chose Campbell's Soup cans as the focal point of his pop art. One reason is that he needed a new subject after he abandoned comic strips, a move taken in part due to his respect for the refined work of Roy Lichtenstein. According to Ted Carey—one of Warhol's commercial art assistants in the late 1950s—it was Muriel Latow who suggested the idea for both the soup cans and Warhol's early U.S. dollar paintings.

Muriel Latow was then an aspiring interior decorator, and owner of the Latow Art Gallery in the East 60s in Manhattan. She told Warhol that he should paint "Something you see every day and something that everybody would recognize. Something like a can of Campbell's Soup." Ted Carey, who was there at the time, said that Warhol responded by exclaiming: "Oh that sounds fabulous." A $50 check dated November 23, 1961 in the archive of the Andy Warhol Museum confirms the story. According to Carey, Warhol went to a supermarket the following day and bought a case of "all the soups", which Carey said he saw when he stopped by Warhol's apartment the next day. When the art critic G. R. Swenson asked Warhol in 1963 why he painted soup cans, the artist replied, "I used to drink it, I used to have the same lunch every day, for twenty years."

Another account of Latow's influence on Warhol holds that she asked him what he loved most, and because he replied "money" she suggested that he paint U.S. dollar bills. According to this story, Latow later advised that in addition to painting money he should paint something else very simple, such as Campbell's Soup cans.

In an interview for London's The Face in 1985, David Yarritu asked Warhol about flowers that Warhol's mother made from tin cans. In his response, Warhol mentioned them as one of the reasons behind his first tin can paintings:
 David Yarritu: I heard that your mother used to make these little tin flowers and sell them to help support you in the early days.
 Andy Warhol: Oh God, yes, it's true, the tin flowers were made out of those fruit cans, that's the reason why I did my first tin-can paintings ... You take a tin-can, the bigger the tin-can the better, like the family size ones that peach halves come in, and I think you cut them with scissors. It's very easy and you just make flowers out of them. My mother always had lots of cans around, including the soup cans.

Several stories mention that Warhol's choice of soup cans reflected his own avid devotion to Campbell's soup as a consumer. Robert Indiana once said: "I knew Andy very well. The reason he painted soup cans is that he liked soup." He was thought to have focused on them because they composed a daily dietary staple. Others observed that Warhol merely painted things he held close at heart. He enjoyed eating Campbell's soup, had a taste for Coca-Cola, loved money, and admired movie stars. Thus, they all became subjects of his work. Yet another account says that his daily lunches in his studio consisted of Campbell's Soup and Coca-Cola, and thus, his inspiration came from seeing the empty cans and bottles accumulate on his desk.

Warhol did not choose the cans because of business relationships with the Campbell Soup Company. Even though the company at the time sold four out of every five cans of prepared soup in the United States, Warhol preferred that the company not be involved "because the whole point would be lost with any kind of commercial tie-in." However, by 1965, the company knew him well enough that he was able to coax actual can labels from them to use as invitations for an exhibit. They even commissioned a canvas.

Message 
Warhol had a positive view of ordinary culture and felt the abstract expressionists had taken great pains to ignore the splendor of modernity. The Campbell's Soup Can series, along with his other series, provided him with a chance to express his positive view of modern culture. However, his deadpan manner endeavored to be devoid of emotional and social commentary. The work was intended to be without personality or individual expression. Warhol's view is encapsulated in the Time magazine description of the 'Slice of Cake School,' that "... a group of painters have come to the common conclusion that the most banal and even vulgar trappings of modern civilization can, when transposed to canvas, become Art."

His pop art work differed from serial works by artists such as Monet, who used series to represent discriminating perception and show that a painter could recreate shifts in time, light, season, and weather with hand and eye. Warhol is now understood to represent the modern era of commercialization and indiscriminate "sameness." When Warhol eventually showed variation it was not "realistic." His later variations in color were almost a mockery of discriminating perception. His adoption of the pseudo-industrial silkscreen process spoke against the use of a series to demonstrate subtlety. Warhol sought to reject invention and nuance by creating the appearance that his work had been printed,  and he systematically recreated imperfections. His series work helped him escape Lichtenstein's lengthening shadow. Although his soup cans were not as shocking and vulgar as some of his other early pop art, they still offended the art world's sensibilities that had developed so as to partake in the intimate emotions of artistic expression.

Contrasting against Caravaggio's sensual baskets of fruit, Chardin's plush peaches, or Cézanne's vibrant arrangements of apples, the mundane Campbell's Soup Cans gave the art world a chill. Furthermore, the idea of isolating eminently recognizable pop culture items was ridiculous enough to the art world that both the merits and ethics of the work were perfectly reasonable debate topics for those who had not even seen the piece. Warhol's pop art can be seen as a relation to Minimal art in the sense that it attempts to portray objects in their most simple, immediately recognizable form. Pop art eliminates overtones and undertones that would otherwise be associated with representations.

Warhol clearly changed the concept of art appreciation. Instead of harmonious three-dimensional arrangements of objects, he chose mechanical derivatives of commercial illustration with an emphasis on the packaging. His variations of multiple soup cans, for example, made the process of repetition an appreciated technique: "If you take a Campbell's Soup can and repeat it fifty times, you are not interested in the retinal image. According to Marcel Duchamp, what interests you is the concept that wants to put fifty Campbell's Soup cans on a canvas." The regimented multiple can depictions almost become an abstraction whose details are less important than the panorama. In a sense, the representation was more important than that which was represented. Warhol's interest in machinelike creation during his early pop art days was misunderstood by those in the art world, whose value system was threatened by mechanization.

In Europe, audiences had a very different take on his work. Many perceived it as a subversive and Marxist satire on American capitalism. If not subversive, it was at least considered a Marxist critique of pop culture. Given Warhol's apolitical outlook in general this is not likely the intended message. According to writer David Bourdon, his pop art may have been nothing more than an attempt to attract attention to his work.

Variations 

Warhol followed the success of his original series with several related works incorporating the same theme of Campbell's Soup cans subjects. These subsequent works along with the original are collectively referred to as the Campbell's Soup cans series and often simply as the Campbell's Soup cans. The subsequent Campbell's Soup can works were very diverse. Occasionally, he chose to depict cans with torn labels, peeling labels, crushed bodies, or opened lids (images right).

Irving Blum made the original thirty-two canvases available to the public through an arrangement with the National Gallery of Art in Washington, DC by placing them on permanent loan two days before Warhol's death. However, the original Campbell's Soup Cans is now a part of the Museum of Modern Art permanent collection. A print called Campbell's Soup Cans II is part of the permanent collection of the Museum of Contemporary Art in Chicago. 200 Campbell's Soup Cans, 1962 (Acrylic on canvas, 72 inches x 100 inches), in the private collection of John and Kimiko Powers is the largest single canvas of the Campbell's Soup can paintings. It is composed of ten rows and twenty columns of numerous flavors of soups. Experts point to it as one of the most significant works of pop art both as a pop representation and as conjunction with immediate predecessors such as Jasper Johns and the successors movements of Minimal and Conceptual art. The very similar 100 Cans from the Albright-Knox Art Gallery collection is shown above. The earliest soup can painting seems to be Campbell's Soup Can (Tomato Rice), a 1961 ink, tempera, crayon, and oil canvas.

In many of the works, including the original series, Warhol drastically simplified the gold medallion that appears on Campbell's Soup cans by replacing the paired allegorical figures with a flat yellow disk. In most variations, the only hint of three-dimensionality came from the shading on the tin lid. Otherwise the image was flat. The works with torn labels are perceived as metaphors of life in the sense that even packaged food must meet its end. They are often described as expressionistic.

By 1970, Warhol established the record auction price for a painting by a living American artist with a $60,000 sale of Big Campbell's Soup Can with Torn Label (Vegetable Beef) (1962) in a sale at Parke-Bernet, the preeminent American auction house of the day (later acquired by Sotheby's). This record was broken a few months later by his rival for the artworld's attention and approval, Lichtenstein, who sold a depiction of a giant brush stroke, Big Painting No. 6 (1965) for $75,000.

In May 2006, Warhol's Small Torn Campbell Soup Can (Pepper Pot) (1962) sold for $11,776,000 and set the current auction world record for a painting from the Campbell Soup Can series. The painting was purchased for the collection of Eli Broad, a man who once set the record for the largest credit card transaction when he purchased Lichtenstein's "I ... I'm Sorry" for $2.5 million with an American Express card.  The $11.8 million Warhol sale was part of the Christie's Sales of Impressionist, Modern, Post-War and Contemporary Art for the Spring Season of 2006 that totaled $438,768,924.

The broad variety of work produced using a semi-mechanized process with many collaborators, Warhol's popularity, the value of his works, and the diversity of works across various media and genre have created a need for the Andy Warhol Art Authentication Board to certify the authenticity of works by Warhol.

On April 7, 2016, seven Campbell's Soup Cans prints were stolen from the Springfield Art Museum. The FBI announced a $25,000 reward for information about the stolen art pieces.

Conclusion 

Warhol's production of Campbell's Soup can works underwent three distinct phases. The first took place in 1962, during which he created realistic images, and produced numerous pencil drawings of the subject. In 1965, Warhol revisited the theme while arbitrarily replacing the original red and white colors with a wider variety of hues. In the late 1970s, he again returned to the soup cans while inverting and reversing the images. The best-remembered Warhol Campbell's Soup can works are from the first phase. Warhol is further regarded for his iconic serial celebrity silkscreens of such people as Elvis Presley, Marilyn Monroe  and Liz Taylor, produced during his 1962–1964 silkscreening phase. His most commonly repeated painting subjects are Taylor, Monroe, Presley, Jackie Kennedy and similar celebrities.

Notes

References

External links 
 Campbell's Soup Cans, 1962 – The Museum of Modern Art, New York

1962 paintings
American art
Campbell Soup Company
Painting series
Paintings by Andy Warhol
Paintings in the collection of the Museum of Modern Art (New York City)
Still life paintings